Antoni Böttcher (19 March 1914 – 19 February 1982) was a Polish footballer. He played in one match for the Poland national football team in 1937.

References

External links
 

1914 births
1982 deaths
Polish footballers
Poland international footballers
Footballers from Berlin
Association football defenders
Polish people of German descent
Lech Poznań players
Polish football managers
Lech Poznań managers